"Give the People What They Want" is a 1975 song written by Kenny Gamble & Leon Huff and performed R&B vocal group The O'Jays. Gamble & Huff also produced the track and was a release from the O"Jays album Survival.

Chart History
"Give the People What They Want" spent one week at number one on the R&B singles chart in the summer of 1975. It peaked at number 45 on the Billboard Hot 100.

Charts

Use in media
The song is currently being used by NBC's WCAU-TV-10 to promote the station's news and other programming. The chorus plays with no other voice-over, along with clips of action in the streets, and station on-air staff with slogans promoting programming. The campaign debuted on 12 February 2010, including a clip of Jay Leno at 11:35, after The Tonight Show with Conan O'Brien was off the air.
The song is used as the intro theme music for former NBA player Jalen Rose's, and ESPN Employee David Jacoby podcast Jalen & Jacoby, for ESPN. The phrase has become Rose's unofficial catchphrase.
The song was also used in a Samsung smartphone TV commercial in February 2017, and then an American Express commercial the following year.
The song appears in the video game Grand Theft Auto IV in the fictional radio station International Funk 99.
In 2022, Liam Gallagher finished his stadium concerts by playing the song over the PA speakers as he left the stage.

Sampling
This song is heavily sampled in EPMD's song "Give the People" from their 1990 album Business as Usual.

Use in Political Campaigns
It was used as part of the regular playlist at campaign events for Barack Obama's 2008 presidential candidacy.

References

External links
[ Song review] on AllMusic

1975 singles
The O'Jays songs
Soul songs
Songs written by Leon Huff
Songs written by Kenny Gamble
1975 songs
Philadelphia International Records singles